Central Christian  School is a private Christian school in Kidron, Ohio. It is a coed school, and they serve 330 students in grades Kindergarten through 12.

Background
Central Christian was founded in 1961 and is owned and operated by the Ohio Conference of the Mennonite Church.  It is the first Mennonite high school in Ohio.  Their mascot is a Comet, although they were known as the Crusaders until June 2000.  The school is also a member of both the OHSAA and the OCSAA.

A longtime independent, Central Christian joined the Mid-Buckeye Conference in the Spring of 2015.

External links
 School Website

Notes and references

Christian schools in Ohio
High schools in Wayne County, Ohio
Private high schools in Ohio
Private middle schools in Ohio
1961 establishments in Ohio
Educational institutions established in 1961